Richard (Rick) Brewster-Jones  is an Australian guitarist who has played in a number of Australian rock bands, including The Angels. His father and grandfather Hooper Brewster-Jones were notable musicians.

Career

In 1970, Brewster, with his brother John and Doc Neeson, formed Moonshine Jug & String Band in Adelaide, the band evolved into The Keystone Angels in 1973. An appearance at the 1975 Sunbury Pop Festival, resulted in touring with AC/DC, and with Chuck Berry as his backing band. By the end of 1975 they become The Angels. Other members included Chris Bailey on bass guitar.

He is still a member of The Angels and currently tours with the band.

Awards and nominations

Australian Songwriter's Hall of Fame
The Australian Songwriters Hall of Fame was established in 2004 to honour the lifetime achievements of some of Australia's greatest songwriters.

|-
| 2008
| himself
| Australian Songwriter's Hall of Fame
| 
|}

SA Music Hall of Fame
Rick was inducted into the SA Music Hall Of fame on 16 May 2014 alongside his brother John, Redgum's John Schumann and Rose Tattoo's Rockin' Rob Riley.

References

General
  Note: Archived [on-line] copy has limited functionality.
  Note: [on-line] version established at White Room Electronic Publishing Pty Ltd in 2007 and was expanded from the 2002 edition.
 Rick Brewster profile by Monica Davidson

Specific

External links
 The Angels
 Rick Brewster Interview - The Rocker Rag

Living people
The Angels (Australian band) members
The Party Boys members
Australian rock guitarists
Rhythm guitarists
Australian male singers
Australian songwriters
Australian male guitarists

Year of birth missing (living people)